Northern University may refer to:
Ahmadu Bello University, formerly known as University of Northern Nigeria
Beijing Jiaotong University, formerly known as Northern Jiaotong University
Charles Darwin University, formerly known as Northern Territory University
Joint Matriculation Board, formerly known as Northern Universities Joint Matriculation Board
Montana State University–Northern
Northern Arizona University
Northern Caribbean University, in Jamaica
Northern Illinois University
Northern Kentucky University
Northern Michigan University
Northern University, Nowshera
Northern State University, in South Dakota
Northern University, Bangladesh
Northern University Games, in Australia
Northern University, Romania
Ohio Northern University
Theological University of Northern Italy – Turin Campus
Université Lille Nord de France
Universiti Utara Malaysia
University College of Northern Denmark
University of Northern California (disambiguation), two separate institutions:
University of Northern California (Santa Rosa)
University of Northern California, Lorenzo Patiño School of Law
University of Northern Colorado
University of Northern Iowa
Northern University High School, run by the University of Northern Iowa
University of Northern Philippines
University of Northern Virginia

See also
Northern College (disambiguation)